Epidemia is the sixth studio album released by American heavy metal band Ill Niño. It was released on October 22, 2012, through Victory Records and is the band's shortest studio album to date. It is also the last album to feature percussionist Daniel Couto, following his departure from the band in 2013, although he has since returned to the band as of 2019.

Track listing
All songs written and composed by Ill Niño

Personnel 
 Dave Chavarri - drums
 Cristian Machado - vocals
 Ahrue Luster - lead guitar
 Diego Verduzco - rhythm guitar
 Lazaro Pina - bass
 Daniel Couto - percussion

Chart performance

References 

2012 albums
Ill Niño albums
Victory Records albums